Frank Feighan (born 4 July 1962) is an Irish Fine Gael politician who has been a Teachta Dála (TD) for the Sligo–Leitrim constituency since 2020, and previously from 2007 to 2016 for the Roscommon–South Leitrim constituency. He served as a Minister of State at the Department of Health from July 2020 to December 2022. He previously served as a Senator for the Administrative Panel from 2002 to 2007 and from 2016 to 2020, after being nominated by the Taoiseach.

Early and personal life
Feighan was born in Sligo in 1966, but is a native of Boyle, County Roscommon. He is married and has two children. He lives in Sligo with his family.

He took part in the RTÉ charity show, You're a Star in 2006 to raise funds for a children's charity.

In 2008, Feighan appeared on the Irish times list of TDs with notable private portfolios. Ownership of multiple properties in addition to shares in mining companies, along with shares in financial institutions are listed.

On 7 November 2021, Feighan experienced symptoms of COVID-19 and a positive test result was announced the next day.

Political career
He was a member of Roscommon County Council from 1999 to 2004. Feighan was first elected to the Dáil at the 2007 general election. He was the party deputy Spokesperson on Transport and Education with special responsibility for Rural and School Transport from 2007 to 2010. In July 2010, he was appointed as party spokesperson on Community, Equality and Gaeltacht Affairs.

He was re-elected at the 2011 general election. In government he voted with Fine Gael on the Roscommon Hospital issue on 6 July 2011, when his constituency colleague Denis Naughten voted against them and lost the Fine Gael party whip. He told the Dáil he was "sincerely sorry" for breaking a pre-election promise in relation to the issue.

On 13 July 2015, he announced that he would not be contesting the 2016 general election.

Shortly before the United Kingdom voted to leave the European Union he expressed his wishes for the Republic of Ireland to rejoin the Commonwealth.

He was the Fine Gael Seanad Spokesperson on Mental Health and Older People.

In July 2020, following the formation of the 32nd Government of Ireland, Feighan was appointed as Minister of State at the Department of Health with responsibility for Public Health, Well Being and the National Drugs Strategy.

In May 2021, Feighan's proposal to introduce minimum unit pricing for alcohol in Ireland was approved by cabinet ministers. Under this legislation, a 10 cent per gram of alcohol minimum cost would be installed, with the minister citing that for example a 70cl bottle of vodka would now cost at a minimum €20.71.

A decision by the Department of Health on the suspension of the North Inner City Drugs Task Force in July 2021 was criticized by the group's director Professor Joe Barry. Feighan, as minister with responsibility for drugs strategy, defended the decision due to "governance shortcomings" in the group. Barry contested that the decision has been carried out to "remove every shred of independence from the task force by taking over the appointment of the chair and the appointment of members".

He was criticised in July 2022 after privately meeting with an anti-cannabis lobby group, known as the Cannabis Risk Alliance. Dr. Garrett McGovern said "If Frank Feighan was willing to meet with one group, he should have met another group who are pro-cannabis legalisation and against prohibition".

He was not re-appointed as a junior minister as part of the 33rd Government of Ireland in December 2022.

References

External links
Frank Feighan's page on the Fine Gael website

 

1962 births
Living people
Fine Gael TDs
Local councillors in County Roscommon
Members of the 22nd Seanad
Members of the 25th Seanad
Members of the 30th Dáil
Members of the 31st Dáil
Members of the 33rd Dáil
Politicians from County Roscommon
You're a Star contestants
Nominated members of Seanad Éireann
Fine Gael senators
Ministers of State of the 33rd Dáil